1105 (eleven hundred [and] five, or one thousand one hundred [and] five) is the natural number following 1104 and preceding 1106.

1105 is the smallest positive integer that is a sum of two positive squares in exactly four different ways, a property that can be connected (via the sum of two squares theorem) to its factorization  as the product of the three smallest prime numbers that are congruent to 1 modulo 4. It is also the second-smallest Carmichael number, after 561, one of the first four Carmichael numbers identified by R. D. Carmichael in his 1910 paper introducing this concept.

Its binary representation 10001010001 and its base-4 representation 101101 are both palindromes, and (because the binary representation has nonzeros only in even positions and its base-4 representation uses only the digits 0 and 1) it is a member of the Moser–de Bruijn sequence of sums of distinct powers of four.

As a number of the form  for  1105 is the magic constant for  magic squares, and as a difference of two consecutive fourth powers  it is a rhombic dodecahedral number, and a magic number for body-centered cubic crystals. These properties are closely related: the difference of two consecutive fourth powers is always a magic constant for an odd magic square whose size is the sum of the two consecutive numbers (here .

References

Integers